The Roots of National Socialism, 1783-1933 is a 1941 book by Rohan Butler.  It is a survey of the German outlook on society from 1783 to 1933.  It details the intellectual developments leading to the ideology of Nazism.

It was first published in June 1941 by Faber & Faber (London) as a 310-page hardcover. E. P. Dutton & co. (New York) republished it in 1942, followed by H. Fertig (New York) in 1968, and AMS Press (New York) in 1985.

Contents
I. Background
II. Romanticism 1783-1815
III. Reaction 1815-1848
IV. Unification 1848-1871
V. Empire 1871-1918
VI. Republic 1918-1933
VII. Foreground
Index

References

The Roots of National Socialism reviewed by C. C. Eckhardt in American Historical Review, Vol. 48, No. 3 (Apr. 1943), pp. 539–540 

1941 non-fiction books
History books about Germany
Political books
20th-century history books
Faber and Faber books